Sherman's March to the Sea (also known as the Savannah campaign or simply Sherman's March) was a military campaign of the American Civil War conducted through Georgia from November 15 until December 21, 1864, by William Tecumseh Sherman, major general of the Union Army. The campaign began on November 15 with Sherman's troops leaving Atlanta, recently taken by Union forces, and ended with the capture of the port of Savannah on December 21. His forces followed a "scorched earth" policy, destroying military targets as well as industry, infrastructure, and civilian property, disrupting the Confederacy's economy and transportation networks. The operation debilitated the Confederacy and helped lead to its eventual surrender. Sherman's decision to operate deep within enemy territory without supply lines was unusual for its time, and the campaign is regarded by some historians as an early example of modern warfare or total war.

Following the March to the Sea, Sherman's army headed north for the Carolinas Campaign.  The portion of this march through South Carolina was even more destructive than the Savannah campaign, since Sherman and his men harbored much ill-will for that state's part in bringing on the start of the Civil War; the following portion, through North Carolina, was less so.

Etymology 
The March to the Sea owes its common name to a poem written by S. H. M. Byers in late 1864. Byers was a Union prisoner of war held at Camp Sorghum, near Columbia, South Carolina. During his imprisonment, Byers wrote a poem about the Savannah campaign which he titled "Sherman's March to the Sea", which was set to music by fellow prisoner W. O. Rockwell. 

When Byers was freed by the Union Capture of Columbia, he approached General Sherman and handed him a scrap of paper. On it was Byers poem. Sherman, reading the paper later in the day, was moved by Byers' poem, and promoted Byers to his staff; the two became lifelong friends. The poem would go on to lend its name to Sherman's campaign, and a version set to music became an instant hit with Sherman's Army and later the public.

Background and objectives

Military situation

Sherman's "March to the Sea" followed his successful Atlanta Campaign of May to September 1864. He and the Union Army's commander, Lt. Gen. Ulysses S. Grant, believed that the Civil War would come to an end only if the Confederacy's strategic capacity for warfare could be decisively broken. Sherman therefore planned an operation that has been compared to the modern principles of scorched earth warfare. Although his formal orders (excerpted below) specified control over destruction of infrastructure in areas in which his army was unmolested by guerrilla activity, he recognized that supplying an army through liberal foraging would have a destructive effect on the morale of the civilian population it encountered in its wide sweep through the state.

The second objective of the campaign was more traditional. Grant's armies in Virginia continued in a stalemate against Robert E. Lee's army, besieged in Petersburg, Virginia. By encroaching into the rear of Lee's positions, Sherman could increase pressure on Lee's Army of Northern Virginia and keep Confederate reinforcements from reaching him.

The campaign was designed by Grant and Sherman to be similar to Grant's innovative and successful Vicksburg campaign and Sherman's Meridian campaign, in that Sherman's armies would reduce their need for traditional supply lines by "living off the land" after consuming their 20 days of rations. Foragers, known as "bummers," would provide food seized from local farms for the army while they destroyed the railroads and the manufacturing and agricultural infrastructure of Georgia. In planning for the march, Sherman used livestock and crop production data from the 1860 census to lead his troops through areas where he believed they would be able to forage most effectively. The twisted and broken railroad rails that the troops heated over fires, wrapped around tree trunks and left behind became known as "Sherman's neckties."

Orders
As the army would be out of touch with the North throughout the campaign, Sherman gave explicit orders, Sherman's Special Field Orders, No. 120, regarding the conduct of the campaign. The following is an excerpt from those orders:

Opposing forces

Union

Sherman, commanding the Military Division of the Mississippi, did not employ his entire army group in the campaign. Confederate Lt. Gen. John Bell Hood was threatening Chattanooga, and Sherman detached two armies under Maj. Gen. George H. Thomas to deal with Hood in the Franklin–Nashville campaign.

When Sherman had prepared his forces for the Atlanta Campaign, which immediately preceded the March to the Sea, he took rigorous steps to insure that only the most physically fit men were accepted, that every man in the army could march for long distances and would fight without reservations.  Sherman wanted only the "best fighting material." Doctors performed in-depth examinations to weed out the weak and those suffering from disease, and this 1% of the men were left behind.  Eighty percent of the remaining soldiers were long-time veterans of campaigns in both the Western theatre, primarily, and the Eastern, a minority.

Sherman had ruthlessly cut to the bone the supplies carried, intending as he did for the army to live off the land as much as possible.  Each division and brigade had a supply train, but the size of the train was strictly limited.  Each regiment had one wagon and one ambulance, and each company had one pack mule for the baggage of its officers; the number of tents carried was curtailed. The staffs of the various headquarters were ruthlessly restricted, and much clerical work was done by permanent offices in the rear.

This was the process by which the 62,000 men (55,000 infantry, 5,000 cavalry, and 2,000 artillerymen manning 64 guns) Sherman commanded were assembled, and would leave Atlanta for Savannah.   They were divided into two columns for the march:
The right wing was the Army of the Tennessee, commanded by Maj. Gen. Oliver O. Howard, consisting of two corps:
 XV Corps, commanded by Maj. Gen. Peter J. Osterhaus, with the divisions of Brig. Gens. Charles R. Woods, William B. Hazen, John E. Smith, and John M. Corse.
 XVII Corps, commanded by Maj. Gen. Frank Blair, Jr., with the divisions of Maj. Gen. Joseph A. Mower and Brig. Gens. Mortimer D. Leggett and Giles A. Smith.
 The left wing was the Army of Georgia, commanded by Maj. Gen. Henry W. Slocum, also with two corps:
 XIV Corps, commanded by Brig. Gen. Jefferson C. Davis, with the divisions of Brig. Gens. William P. Carlin, James D. Morgan, and Absalom Baird.
 XX Corps, commanded by Brig. Gen. Alpheus S. Williams, with the divisions of Brig. Gens. Nathaniel J. Jackson, John W. Geary, and William T. Ward.
 A cavalry division under Brig. Gen. Judson Kilpatrick operated in support of the two wings, and reported directly to Sherman.

In 1929, British military historian B. H. Liddell Hart described the men of Sherman's army as "probably the finest army of military 'workmen' the modern world has seen. An army of individuals trained in the school of experience to look after their own food and health, to march far and fast with the least fatigue, to fight with the least exposure, above all, to act swiftly and to work thoroughly."  After his surrender to Sherman, Confederate General Joseph E. Johnston said of Sherman's men that "there has been no such army since the days of Julius Caesar."

Confederate

The Confederate opposition from Lt. Gen. William J. Hardee's Department of South Carolina, Georgia, and Florida was meager. Hood had taken the bulk of forces in Georgia on his campaign to Tennessee in hopes of diverting Sherman to pursue him. Considering Sherman's military priorities, however, this tactical maneuver by his enemy to get out of his force's path was welcomed to the point of remarking, "If he will go to the Ohio River, I'll give him rations." There were about 13,000 men remaining at Lovejoy's Station, south of Atlanta. Maj. Gen. Gustavus W. Smith's Georgia militia had about 3,050 soldiers, most of whom were boys and elderly men. The Cavalry Corps of Maj. Gen. Joseph Wheeler, reinforced by a brigade under Brig. Gen. William H. Jackson, had approximately 10,000 troopers. During the campaign, the Confederate War Department brought in additional men from Florida and the Carolinas, but they never were able to increase their effective force beyond 13,000.

March
Both U.S. President Abraham Lincoln and General Ulysses S. Grant had serious reservations about Sherman's plans. Still, Grant trusted Sherman's assessment and on November 2, 1864, he sent Sherman a telegram stating simply, "Go as you propose." The  march began on November 15. Sherman recounted in his memoirs the scene when he left at 7 am the following day:

Sherman's personal escort on the march was the 1st Alabama Cavalry Regiment, a unit made up entirely of Southerners who remained loyal to the Union.

The two wings of the army attempted to confuse and deceive the enemy about their destinations; the Confederates could not tell from the initial movements whether Sherman would march on Macon, Augusta, or Savannah. Howard's wing, led by Kilpatrick's cavalry, marched south along the railroad to Lovejoy's Station, which caused the defenders there to conduct a fighting retreat to Macon. The cavalry captured two Confederate guns at Lovejoy's Station, and then two more and 50 prisoners at Bear Creek Station. Howard's infantry marched through Jonesboro to Gordon, southwest of the state capital, Milledgeville. Slocum's wing, accompanied by Sherman, moved to the east, in the direction of Augusta. They destroyed the bridge across the Oconee River and then turned south.

The first real resistance was felt by Howard's right wing at the Battle of Griswoldville on November 22. Confederate Maj. Gen. Wheeler's cavalry struck Brig. Gen. Kilpatrick's, killing one, wounding two and capturing 18. The infantry brigade of Brig. Gen. Charles C. Walcutt arrived to stabilize the defense, and the division of Georgia militia launched several hours of badly coordinated attacks, eventually retreating with about 1,100 casualties (of which about 600 were prisoners), versus the Union's 100.

At the same time, Slocum's left wing approached the state capital at Milledgeville, prompting the hasty departure of Governor Joseph Brown and the state legislature. On November 23, Slocum's troops captured the city and held a mock legislative session in the capitol building, jokingly voting Georgia back into the Union.

Several small actions followed. Wheeler and some infantry struck in a rearguard action at Ball's Ferry on November 24 and November 25. While Howard's wing was delayed near Ball's Bluff, the 1st Alabama Cavalry (a Federal regiment) engaged Confederate pickets. On November 25–26 at Sandersville, Wheeler struck at Slocum's advance guard. Kilpatrick was ordered to make a feint toward Augusta before destroying the railroad bridge at Brier Creek and moving to liberate the Camp Lawton prisoner of war camp at Millen. Kilpatrick slipped by the defensive line that Wheeler had placed near Brier Creek, but on the night of November 26 Wheeler attacked and drove the 8th Indiana and 2nd Kentucky Cavalry away from their camps at Sylvan Grove. Kilpatrick abandoned his plans to destroy the railroad bridge and he also learned that the prisoners had been moved from Camp Lawton, so he rejoined the army at Louisville. At the Battle of Buck Head Creek on November 28, Kilpatrick was surprised and nearly captured, but the 5th Ohio Cavalry halted Wheeler's advance, and Wheeler was later stopped decisively by Union barricades at Reynolds's Plantation. On December 4, Kilpatrick's cavalry routed Wheeler's at the Battle of Waynesboro.

More Union troops entered the campaign from an unlikely direction. Maj. Gen. John G. Foster dispatched 5,500 men and 10 guns under Brig. Gen. John P. Hatch from Hilton Head, hoping to assist Sherman's arrival near Savannah by securing the Charleston and Savannah Railroad. Smith's militia fought off the Union attacks, and Hatch withdrew after suffering about 650 casualties, versus Smith's 50.

Sherman's armies reached the outskirts of Savannah on December 10 but found that Hardee had entrenched 10,000 men in favorable fighting positions, and his soldiers had flooded the surrounding rice fields, leaving only narrow causeways available to approach the city. Sherman was blocked from linking up with the U.S. Navy as he had planned, so he dispatched cavalry to Fort McAllister, guarding the Ogeechee River, in hopes of unblocking his route and obtaining supplies awaiting him on the Navy ships. On December 13, William B. Hazen's division of Howard's wing stormed the fort in the Battle of Fort McAllister and captured it within 15 minutes. Some of the 134 Union casualties were caused by torpedoes, a name for crude land mines that were used only rarely in the war.

Now that Sherman had contact with the Navy fleet under Rear Admiral John A. Dahlgren, he was able to obtain the supplies and siege artillery he required to invest Savannah. On December 17, he sent a message to Hardee in the city:

Hardee decided not to surrender but to escape. On December 20, he led his men across the Savannah River on a makeshift pontoon bridge. The next morning, Savannah Mayor Richard Dennis Arnold, with a delegation of aldermen and ladies of the city, rode out (until they were unhorsed by fleeing Confederate cavalrymen) to offer a proposition: The city would surrender and offer no resistance, in exchange for General Geary's promise to protect the city's citizens and their property. Geary telegraphed Sherman, who advised him to accept the offer. Arnold presented him with the key to the city, and Sherman's men, led by Geary's division of the XX Corps, occupied the city the same day.

Aftermath

Sherman telegraphed to President Lincoln, "I beg to present you as a Christmas gift the City of Savannah, with one hundred and fifty heavy guns and plenty of ammunition and about twenty-five thousand bales of cotton." On December 26, the president replied in a letter:

The March attracted a huge number of refugees, to whom Sherman assigned land with his Special Field Orders No. 15. These orders have been depicted in popular culture as the origin of the "40 acres and a mule" promise.

From Savannah, after a month-long delay for rest, Sherman marched north in the spring through the Carolinas, intending to complete his turning movement and combine his armies with Grant's against Robert E. Lee. Sherman's next major action was the capture of Columbia, the strategically important capital of South Carolina. After a successful two-month campaign, Sherman accepted the surrender of General Joseph E. Johnston and his forces in North Carolina on April 26, 1865.

Sherman's scorched earth policies have always been highly controversial, and Sherman's memory has long been reviled by many Southerners. Slaves' opinions varied concerning the actions of Sherman and his army. Some who welcomed him as a liberator chose to follow his armies. Jacqueline Campbell has written, on the other hand, that some slaves looked upon the Union army's ransacking and invasive actions with disdain. They often felt betrayed, as they "suffered along with their owners, complicating their decision of whether to flee with or from Union troops", although that is now seen as a post synopsis of Confederate nationalism. A Confederate officer estimated that 10,000 liberated slaves followed Sherman's army, and hundreds died of "hunger, disease, or exposure" along the way.

The March to the Sea was devastating to Georgia and the Confederacy. Sherman himself estimated that the campaign had inflicted $100million (equivalent to $million in ) in destruction, about one fifth of which "inured to our advantage" while the "remainder is simple waste and destruction". The Army wrecked  of railroad and numerous bridges and miles of telegraph lines. It seized 5,000 horses, 4,000 mules, and 13,000 head of cattle. It confiscated 9.5 million pounds of corn and 10.5 million pounds of fodder, and destroyed uncounted cotton gins and mills. Military historians Herman Hattaway and Archer Jones cited the significant damage wrought to railroads and Southern logistics in the campaign and stated that "Sherman's raid succeeded in 'knocking the Confederate war effort to pieces'." David J. Eicher wrote that "Sherman had accomplished an amazing task. He had defied military principles by operating deep within enemy territory and without lines of supply or communication. He destroyed much of the South's potential and psychology to wage war."

According to a 2022 American Economic Journal study which sought to measure the medium- and long-term economic impact of Sherman's March, "the capital destruction induced by the March led to a large contraction in agricultural investment, farming asset prices, and manufacturing activity. Elements of the decline in agriculture persisted through 1920".

Legacy

Union soldiers sang many songs during the March, but it is one written afterward that has come to symbolize the campaign: "Marching Through Georgia", written by Henry Clay Work in 1865. Sung from the point of view of a Union soldier, the lyrics detail the freeing of slaves and punishing the Confederacy for starting the war. Sherman came to dislike the song, in part because he was never one to rejoice over a fallen foe, and in part because it was played at almost every public appearance that he attended. It was widely popular among US soldiers of 20th-century wars.

Hundreds of African Americans drowned trying to cross in Ebenezer Creek north of Savannah while attempting to follow Sherman's Army in its March to the Sea. In 2011 a historical marker was erected there by the Georgia Historical Society to commemorate the African Americans who had risked so much for freedom.

There has been disagreement among historians on whether Sherman's March constituted total war. In the years following World War II, several writers argued that the total war tactics used during World War II were comparable to the tactics used during Sherman's March. Subsequent historians have objected to the comparison, arguing that Sherman's tactics were not as severe or indiscriminate. Some historians refer to Sherman's tactics as "hard war" to emphasize the distinction between Sherman's tactics and those used during World War II.

See also

 The March: A Novel (2005 historical novel by E. L. Doctorow)
 Sherman's Special Field Orders, No. 15
 Sherman's Special Field Orders, No. 120
 Sherman's March (2007 documentary)
 Western Theater of the American Civil War

References
Notes

Bibliography 
 Campbell, Jacqueline Glass (2003) When Sherman Marched North from the Sea: Resistance on the Confederate Home Front. Chapel Hill, North Carolina: University of North Carolina Press. .
 Catton, Bruce (1965) The Centennial History of the Civil War. Vol. 3, Never Call Retreat. Garden City, New York: Doubleday. .
 Eicher, David J. ( 2001) The Longest Night: A Military History of the Civil War. New York: Simon & Schuster. .
 Glatthaar, Joseph T. (1995) [1985] The March to the Sea and Beyond: Sherman's Troops in the Savannah and Carolinas Campaigns. Baton Rouge: Louisiana State University Press. .
 Hattaway, Herman, and Archer Jones. How the North Won: A Military History of the Civil War. Urbana, Illinois: University of Illinois Press, 1983. .
 Kennett, Lee (1995) Marching through Georgia: The Story of Soldiers and Civilians During Sherman's Campaign. New York: HarperCollins Publishers. .
 Liddell Hart, B. H. (1993) [1929] Sherman: Realist, Soldier, American. New York: Da Capo Press. 
 McPherson, James M. (1988) Battle Cry of Freedom: The Civil War Era. Oxford History of the United States. New York: Oxford University Press. .
 Melton, Brian C. (2007) Sherman's Forgotten General. Columbia, Missouri: University of Missouri Press. .
 Nevin, David and the Editors of Time-Life Books (1986) Sherman's March: Atlanta to the Sea. Alexandria, Virginia: Time-Life Books .
 Trudeau, Noah Andre. (2008) Southern Storm: Sherman's March to the Sea. New York: HarperCollins. .

Primary sources
 Sherman, William T. Memoirs of General W.T. Sherman. 2nd ed. New York: Library of America, 1990. . First published 1889 by D. Appleton & Co.
 U.S. War Department, The War of the Rebellion: a Compilation of the Official Records of the Union and Confederate Armies. Washington, DC: U.S. Government Printing Office, 1880–1901.
"Savannah Campaign Union order of battle" (Official Records, Series I, Volume XLIV, pp. 19–25
"Savannah Campaign Confederate order of battle" (Official Records, Series I, Volume XLIV, pp. 875–876)

Further reading

 Davis, Burke, Sherman's March, Random House Publishing Group, 1980 / 2016. 
 Davis, Stephen, What the Yankees Did to Us: Sherman's Bombardment and Wrecking of Atlanta. Macon, GA: Mercer University Press, 2012. 
 Fowler, John D. and David B. Parker, eds. Breaking the Heartland: The Civil War in Georgia. 2011 

 Ludwick, Carol R; Rudy, Robert R. March to the Sea. Lexographic Press, 2022. 
 Miers, Earl Schenck. The General Who Marched to Hell; William Tecumseh Sherman and His March to Fame and Infamy. New York: Knopf, 1951. 
 Miles, Jim. To the Sea: A History and Tour Guide of the War in the West, Sherman's March across Georgia and through the Carolinas, 1864–1865. Nashville, TN: Cumberland House, 2002. .
 Rhodes, James Ford. "Sherman's March to the Sea" American Historical Review 6#3 (1901) pp. 466–474 online free old classic account

 Secrist, Philip L., Sherman's 1864 Trail of Battle to Atlanta. Macon, GA: Mercer University Press, 2006. 
 Smith, David, and Richard Hook. Sherman's March to the Sea 1864: Atlanta to Savannah Osprey Publishing, 2012.   
 Smith, Derek. Civil War Savannah. Savannah, Ga: Frederic C. Beil, 1997. .
 Welch, Robert Christopher. "Forage Liberally: The Role of Agriculture in Sherman's March to the Sea." Iowa State University thesis, 2011. online

External links

 Groce, W. Todd, Rethinking Sherman's March
 Today in Georgia History: March to the Sea
 Today in Georgia History: Sherman in Savannah
 National Park Service battle descriptions for the Savannah Campaign
 National Park Service report on preservation and historic boundaries at the Savannah Campaign battlefields
 Harper's History: March to the sea
 New Georgia Encyclopedia article on the March
 Army of Georgia Historical Society
 Clark, Frank Oliver, Article on Sherman's March to the Sea
 Photographic views of Sherman's campaign, from negatives taken in the field, by Geo. N. Barnard, official photographer of the military div. of the Mississippi. Published/Created: New York, Press of Wynkoop & Hallenbeck, 1866. (searchable facsimile at the University of Georgia Libraries; DjVu & layered PDF format)
 Sheet music for "Sherman's March to the Sea" from Project Gutenberg
 Photo of Sherman's handwritten note for the telegraph, offering Savannah as a present for President Lincoln
 Noah Andre Trudeau Webcast Author Lecture at the Pritzker Military Museum & Library on September 11, 2008.
 Georgia Public Broadcasting: 37 weeks – Sherman on the March
 The March to the Sea historical marker

 
March to the Sea
1864 in the American Civil War
Conflicts in 1864
1864 in Georgia (U.S. state)
Campaigns of the Western Theater of the American Civil War
Military operations of the American Civil War in Georgia (U.S. state)